Nathaniel Semple (October 22, 1876 – October 3, 1913) was an American tennis player. He competed in the men's singles and doubles events at the 1904 Summer Olympics.

He earned a medical degree from Washington University in 1897. He died at his home in St. Louis on October 3, 1913.

References

External links
 
 

1876 births
1913 deaths
American male tennis players
Olympic tennis players of the United States
Tennis players at the 1904 Summer Olympics
People from Liberty, Missouri
Sportspeople from Missouri
Tennis people from Missouri
Washington University School of Medicine alumni